A link page is a type of web page that contains a list of links the website owner finds notable to mention, such as partner organizations, clients, friends, hobbies, or related projects.

Links pages were popular on personal websites during the Web 1.0 era, functioning similarly to webrings as a navigation device.

See also
 Contact page
 Home page
 Site map
 Smart links

Web design
Web 1.0